Boonville may refer to:

Places in the United States
Boonville, California
Boonville, Indiana
Boonville, Missouri
Boonville Township, Cooper County, Missouri
Boonville (town), New York
Boonville (village), New York, within the town of Boonville
Boonville, North Carolina
Boonville, Texas

Other uses
Boonville (novel), by Robert Mailer Anderson, set in Boonville, California

See also

Booneville (disambiguation)